The Ashtamangala is a sacred suite of Eight Auspicious Signs endemic to a number of religions such as Hinduism, Jainism, and Buddhism. The symbols or "symbolic attributes" are yidam and teaching tools. Not only do these attributes (or energetic signatures) point to qualities of enlightened mindstream, but they are the investiture that ornaments these enlightened "qualities" (Sanskrit: guṇa). Many cultural enumerations and variations of the Ashtamangala are extant.

In Buddhism 

Tibetan Buddhists make use of a particular set of eight auspicious symbols, ashtamangala, in household and public art. Some common interpretations are given along with each symbol although different teachers may give different interpretations:

Conch 

The right-turning white conch shell represents the beautiful, deep, melodious, interpenetrating and pervasive sound of the dharma, which awakens disciples from the deep slumber of ignorance and urges them to accomplish their own welfare for the welfare of others.

Endless knot 

The endless knot (Sanskrit: śrīvatsa) denotes "the auspicious mark represented by a curled noose emblematic of love". It is a symbol of the ultimate unity of everything. Moreover, it represents the intertwining of wisdom and compassion, the mutual dependence of religious doctrine and secular affairs, the union of wisdom and method, the inseparability of śūnyatā "emptiness" and pratītyasamutpāda "interdependent origination", and the union of wisdom and compassion in enlightenment (see namkha). This knot, net or web metaphor also conveys the Buddhist teaching of interpenetration.. It is also an attribute of the god Vishnu, which is said to be engraved on his chest. A similar engraving of the Shrivatsa on the historical Gautama Buddha's chest is mentioned in some lists of the Physical characteristics of the Buddha.

Pair of Golden Fish 

The two golden fish (Sanskrit: gaurmatsya) symbolise the auspiciousness of all sentient beings in a state of fearlessness without danger of drowning in saṃsāra. The two golden fishes are linked with the Ganges and Yamuna nadi,  prana and carp:

Lotus 

The lotus flower (Sanskrit: padma) represents the primordial purity of body, speech, and mind, floating above the muddy waters of attachment and desire. The lotus symbolizes purity and renunciation. Although the lotus has its roots in the mud at the bottom of a pond, its flower lies immaculate above the water. The Buddhist lotus bloom has 4, 8, 16, 24, 32, 64, 100, or 1,000 petals. The same figures can refer to the body's 'internal lotuses', that is to say, its energy centres (chakra).

Parasol 

The jewelled parasol (Sanskrit: chatraratna), which is similar in ritual function to the baldachin or canopy: represents the protection of beings from harmful forces and illness. It represents the canopy or firmament of the sky and therefore the expansiveness and unfolding of space and the element æther. It represents the expansiveness, unfolding and protective quality of the sahasrara: all take refuge in the dharma under the auspiciousness of the parasol.

Vase 

The treasure vase  represents health, longevity, wealth, prosperity, wisdom and the phenomenon of space. The treasure vase, or pot, symbolizes the Buddha's infinite quality of teaching the dharma: no matter how many teachings he shared, the treasure never lessened.

The iconography representation of the treasure vase is often very similar to the kumbha, one of the few possessions permitted a bhikkhu or bhikkhuni in Theravada Buddhism. The wisdom urn or treasure vase is used in many empowerment (Vajrayana) and initiations.

Dharmachakra 

The Dharmachakra or "Wheel of the Law" (Sanskrit) represents Gautama Buddha and the Dharma teaching. This symbol is commonly used by Tibetan Buddhists, where it sometimes also includes an inner wheel of the Gankyil (Tibetan). Nepalese Buddhists don't use the Wheel of Law in the eight auspicious symbols.

Instead of the Dharmachakra, a fly-whisk may be used as one of the Ashtamangala to symbolize Tantric manifestations. It is made of a yak's tail attached to a silver staff, and used in ritual recitation and during fanning the deities in pujas. Prayer wheels take the form of a Dharmachakra guise.

Victory Banner 

The dhvaja (Sanskrit) "banner, flag" was a military standard of ancient Indian warfare. The symbol represents the Buddha's victory over the four māras, or hindrances in the path of enlightenment. These hindrances are pride, desire, disturbing emotions, and the fear of death. Within the Tibetan tradition, a list of eleven different forms of the victory banner is given to represent eleven specific methods for overcoming defilement. Many variations of the dhvaja's design can be seen on the roofs of Tibetan monasteries to symbolise the Buddha's victory over four māras. Banners are placed at the four corners of monastery and temple roofs. The cylindrical banners placed on monastery roofs are often made of beaten copper.

Sequences of symbols 
Different traditions order the eight symbols differently.

Here is the sequential order of the Eight Auspicious Symbols of Nepali Buddhism:
 Endless knot
 Lotus flower
 Dhvaja
 Dharmachakra (fly-whisk in Nepali Buddhism)
 Bumpa
 Golden Fish
 Parasol
 Conch

The sequential order for Chinese Buddhism was defined in the Qing dynasty as:
 Dharmachakra
 Conch
 Dhvaja
 Parasol
 Lotus flower
 Bumpa
 Golden Fish
 Endless knot

Hindu symbols 
In Indian and Hindu tradition, the Ashtamangala may be used during certain occasions including: pujas, weddings (of Hindus), and coronations. The ashtamangala finds wide mention in the texts associated with Hinduism, Buddhism, and Jainism. They have been depicted in decorative motifs and cultural artifacts.

 The Hindu tradition lists them as:
 lion called raja
 bull called vrishaba
 serpent called naga
 pitcher called kalasa
 necklace called vaijayanti
 kettledrum called bheri
 fan called vyajana
 lamp called deepa
 The Hindu tradition lists them as:
 fly-whisk
 full vase
 mirror
 elephant goad
 drum
 lamp
 flag
 a pair of fish.
 The list also differs depending on the place, region, and the social groups.

Jain symbols

In Jainism, the Ashtamangala are a set of eight auspicious symbols. There is some variation among different traditions concerning the eight symbols.

In the Digambara tradition, the eight symbols are:
 Parasol
 Dhvaja
Kalasha
 Chamara
 Mirror
 Chair
 Hand fan
 Vessel

In the Śvētāmbara tradition, the eight symbols are:
 Swastika
Srivatsa
 Nandavarta
 Vardhmanaka (food vessel)
 Bhadrasana (seat)
Kalasha (pot)
 Darpan (mirror)
 Pair of fish

See also 
 Dzi bead
 Eight Treasures (Chinese equivalent)
 Iconography
 Mani stone
 Sandpainting

References

Citations

Sources 
  Beer, Robert (1999). The Encyclopedia of Tibetan Symbols and Motifs, (Hardcover). Shambhala Publications. , 
  Beer, Robert (2003). The Handbook of Tibetan Buddhist Symbols,  Shambhala Publications.

External links

About The Eight Auspicious Symbols
Tibetan Buddhist Symbols

Buddhist symbols
Indian iconography
Jain symbols
Buddhist philosophical concepts
Tantric practices
Tibetan Buddhist art and culture
Hindu symbols
Hindu philosophical concepts
Magic items